The inaugural season of Danmark Har Talent aired on TV 2 on 31 December 2014 and finished in 2015. The series was hosted by Christopher Læssø and Felix Schmidt. On the judging panel were Jarl Friis-Mikkelsen, Cecilie Lassen, Peter Frödin and TopGunn. In this series the golden buzzer is available for each judge to press once the whole series to put one act straight through to the live shows.

Background 
It was announced TV 2 will make the first series of the show, to premiere 31 December 2014 and finish early 2015.  There was a previous show called Talent, which ran for 3 series from 2010-2013.

Difference To Talent 
Danmark Har Talent differed from the first three series of Talent because for the first time these a golden buzzer which is used when each judge want to put an act straight through to the live shows, the golden buzzer has been used worldwide in got talent franchise firstly used on das supertalent the German version of the show and Britain's Got Talent British version of got talent. this series for the first time has a 4th judge which each act have to restive three yes's to go through to the next round and 4 x's to stop the act either in the auditions or live shows.

Semi-finals

Semi-final summary

Semi Finals 1

Semi Finals 2

Semi Finals 3

Semi Finals 4

Final 12 Part 1

Final 12 Part 2

Final

Semi-finalists

{|
|-
|}

Got Talent
2014 Danish television seasons
2015 Danish television seasons